Sir George Augustus Alexander Westphal (27 March 1785 – 12 January 1875) was a Nova Scotian admiral in the Royal Navy who served in more than 100 actions. He was midshipman on HMS Victory during the Battle of Trafalgar.

Early life

Westphal was born on 27 March 1785 in Nova Scotia, the son of George Westphal and older brother of Admiral Philip Westphal.

He joined the Royal Navy aged 13 as a first class volunteer on board the Royal navy frigate  stationed in North America.

In March 1803 Westphal joined the 32 gun fifth rate frigate HMS Amphion as a midshipman whilst transporting Horatio Nelson to the Mediterranean to take command. Westphal was transferred to HMS Victory.

Battle of Trafalgar

On 21 October 1805 Westphal was in the Battle of Trafalgar fighting on Nelson's flagship Victory. Westphal was shot in the head and taken to the sick bay, where he was laid near the injured Nelson.

Westphal explained in an 1842 article in the United Service magazine: 

Many years after the battle, the Admiralty asked Westphal to identify Nelson's coat after Prince Albert had bought it for the National Maritime Museum at Greenwich. Westphal was able to authenticate it with his fragments.

After Trafalgar
Ocean was a 98-gun second-rate ship of the line commanded by Captain Frances Pender.

On 15 August 1806 Westphal was promoted to lieutenant on the sloop  in the West Indies. He was captured when the French privateer Alerte took , the merchant ship he was returning to England on, during which action he was again severely wounded while leading her resistance. However he escaped from prison in Guadeloupe and was picked up by an American ship. He returned to the West Indies as a lieutenant aboard , and later , ships under the command of Commodore Sir George Cockburn. He fought on land during the 1809 invasion of Martinique.

After another period in home waters, he returned to West Indies where he served aboard HMS Chesapeake. Their targets were two privateer schooners, Anaconda and Atlas, as well as a revenue cutter. As the British boats approached, the Americans opened fire. Westphal's division, attacked and captured both privateers. However, the revenue cutter escaped up the Neuse River to New Bern, where she gave warning of the British forces, permitting the preparation of defences that forestalled the Royal Navy from any further advance. Both privateers were condemned at Halifax and the British took them into service,  under her name, and Atlas as HMS St Lawrence. Westphal, newly promoted to commander with backdate to 8 July, commissioned Anaconda.

The Anaconda was refitted at Halifax, and Westphal received a crew of 60 men, most of whom were the dregs of the fleet, offered by their captains when Admiral John Borlase Warren asked for drafts. Her first task was to escort a convoy of twelve merchant vessels from there to the West Indies. While doing so she fought off an attack by two large American privateers. One of the privateers surrendered after losing her jib-boom and fore-top-mast but then escaped when the Anaconda lost her own fore-top-mast chasing after the second privateer. Warren then transferred the Anaconda to the Jamaica station.

After their defeat at Fort Bowyer, the British turned their attention to an attack on New Orleans. In the run-up to battle, Captain Nicholas Lockyer captured an American flotilla, consisting primarily of five gunboats, in the Battle of Lake Borgne. Anaconda did not contribute her boats and crew to the battle, but evacuated the 77 men who had been wounded there.

During Sir Alexander Cochrane's expedition against New Orleans in December, Cochrane ordered Westphal to lighten Anaconda and to get her into Lake Borgne. Westphal took Anaconda with great difficulty over shoals. Anaconda, gun-vessels, and hired craft then moved the advance guard up the bayou in preparation for the New Orleans. By forcing Anaconda over a bank five miles wide that was only eight feet under water, Westphal was able to get her into position 20 miles ahead of the other British warships where she could protect the boats bringing up supplies and troops. Captain Thomas Hardy of  wrote in a letter that Anacondas protection surely saved many of the boats from capture by the Americans.

Westphal later landed with the greater part of Anaconda'''s crew, who then fought in the naval brigade under Captain Edward Troubridge. At the battle they helped man the batteries.

In February 1815, Anaconda and the schooner Shelburne under Westphal's orders cruised off the Florida coast north of Havana.Anaconda was paid off in April 1815. She underwent a survey at Jamaica that found that she had sustained too much damage in the New Orleans campaign to merit retention in service. Anaconda was condemned and then sold on 5 May 1815. Westphal returned to Britain in July as a passenger aboard .

Post-war
Westphal married Alicia Chambers in 1817.

He was promoted to post-captain on 12 August 1819. In 1822 Westphal took command of HMS Jupiter, and in her took Lord Amherst to India to serve as governor general.  Westphal was knighted on his return to England and served as flag captain to Sir George Cockburn in 1832 but was invalided out of active service in 1834.

Retirement

Westphal retired to Hove in Sussex where he lived (1836–1875) until his death. On the retired list, he was promoted to rear admiral (17 August 1851), vice admiral (10 September 1857) and finally admiral (23 March 1863).

When Westphal died on 12 January 1875, he was the last surviving Royal Navy officer to have fought at Trafalgar on board HMS Victory''. He had lived until the age of 90, some 70 years after seeing Nelson die.  He was buried in the family vault at the St Andrew's Church, Church Road, Hove.

Legacy 
 Westphal, Nova Scotia
 Admiral Westphal Elementary School

See also
 
Military history of Nova Scotia

External links
  Plaque  - Admiral Sir George Augustus Westphal served in over 100 actions and wounded at Trafalgar on HMS Victory lived here 1836-1875  by Hove Borough Council
  Gravesite of Admiral Sir George Augustus Westphal
 House of Admiral Sir George Augustus Westphal, Hove, England
 Image of Nelson's Jacket used to assist Westphal

References
Texts
  Biography of Westphal
 
 Weston, William (1550?-1615)	Dictionary of National Biography, 1885–1900, Volume 60, Westphal, George Augustus by John Knox Laughton.
 Nova Scotians - George Augustus Westphal

Endnotes

Royal Navy admirals
Canadian knights
Royal Navy personnel of the Napoleonic Wars
1785 births
1875 deaths